William Matthew Wand Addison, 4th Viscount Addison (born 13 June 1945), is a British peer. The son of Michael Addison, 3rd Viscount Addison, he succeeded the Viscountcy on the death of his father in 1992.

He was educated at Westminster School and King's School, Bruton.

In the House of Lords, Viscount Addison had sat as a Conservative peer until the House of Lords Act 1999 removed his automatic right to sit in the House. He stood for election as an elected hereditary peer (and therefore possessing the right to continue to sit). However, he finished 47th amongst the Conservative peers (a total of 42 Conservative peers were elected). He has stood in subsequent by-elections for election to the House, but to date has been unsuccessful.

On 10 October 1970, he married Joanna Mary Dickinson, with whom he had the following children:

Hon. Sarah Louise Addison (b. 1971)
Hon. Paul Wand Addison (b. 1973)
Hon. Caroline Amy Addison (b. 1979)

In 1991, he married Lesley Ann Mawer.

Arms

References

External links

1945 births
Living people
People educated at Westminster School, London
People educated at King's School, Bruton
Conservative Party (UK) hereditary peers
William

Addison